Taj Sehrai (Sindhi:تاج صحرائي ) (Urdu:تاج صحرائی) (14 September 1921 – 29 October 2002) was a prominent Pakistani author and archaeologist from Sindh, Pakistan.

Early life
His real name was Taj Muhammad Memon. He was born on 14 September 1921 in Shikarpur city of Shikarpur District, Sindh, Pakistan.

Contribution
He shifted from Shikarpur to Dadu city and settled here. He served as teacher and being an educationist he was a founder of Talibul Mola High School Dadu Sindh, Pakistan. He was founder of Allama I. I Kazi library Dadu, Sindh as well. He authored several books in Sindhi and English languages. His book in English language, the Lake Manchar is his countable contribution. He was awarded with presidential national award of pride of performance for literary contribution on 14 August 1990.

Death
He died on 29 October 2002 due to heart attack and buried in Lal Hindu graveyard Dadu.

References

Pakistani writers
Sindhi writers
Sindhi people
1921 births
2002 deaths